Spain competed at the 2009 Mediterranean Games held in Pescara, Italy.

Medals

Nations at the 2009 Mediterranean Games
2009
Mediterranean Games